Jakub Kotala (born June 15, 1996) is a Czech professional ice hockey player. He is currently playing for AZ Havířov of the Czech 1.liga.

Kotala made his Czech Extraliga debut playing with BK Mladá Boleslav during the 2014-15 Czech Extraliga season.

References

External links

1996 births
Living people
BK Mladá Boleslav players
AZ Havířov players
Czech ice hockey forwards
HC Olomouc players
HC Vítkovice players
People from Havířov
Sportspeople from the Moravian-Silesian Region